The Volga Boatman may refer to:
A burlak (barge hauler) on the Volga River
The Volga Boatman (1926 film), an American drama film directed by Cecil B. DeMille
The Volga Boatman (1936 film), a French drama film directed by Vladimir Strizhevsky 
"The Song of the Volga Boatmen", a traditional Russian song
Barge Haulers on the Volga, a painting by Ilya Repin
 “Volga Boatman” name of the boat in ‘City beneath the Sea’ 1953 movie with Robert Ryan and Anthony Quinn.